Nkiruka Florence Nwakwe (born c. 1994), also known as Nkiruka Nwakwe, is a Nigerian sprinter and hurdler. She competed at local and international level representing Nigeria in female athletics competitions.

Career 
Nkiruka Florence Nwakwe started her career as a junior sprint runner and hurdler in Nigeria where she competes in various local competitions. She won her major competitive gold medal at the 2010 Summer Youth Olympics in Athletics at 200 the metres events and also sparticipated at The women's 4 × 100 metres relay at the 2012 World Junior Championships in Athletics in Athletics which was held at the Estadi Olímpic Lluís Companys on 13 and 14 July, she also participated in the African 4 × 400 m relay team that won silver medals at the 2010 Summer Youth Olympics with Josephine Omaka from Nigeria, Izelle Neuhoff from South Africa and Bukola Abogunloko another Nigerian.

Achievements

Girls
Track and road events

 
Field Events

National Olympic Committees (NOCs), mixed-NOCs teams in the 2010 Summer Youth Olympics

Personal bests
200 metres – 23.46 (2010)
200 metres – 24.55 – Nsukka (NGR) – 21 APR 2012

See also
Omolade Akinremi
Josephine Omaka

References

1994 births
Living people
Nigerian female sprinters
Nigerian female hurdlers
Youth Olympic gold medalists for Nigeria
Youth Olympic gold medalists in athletics (track and field)
21st-century Nigerian women